Orcadia refers to the islands of Orkney.

Orcadia may also refer to:

Places
 A hamlet in Rural Municipality of Orkney No. 244, Saskatchewan, Canada

Ships
 , a World War 1 Admiralty M-class destroyer
 , a World War 2 Algerine-class minesweeper
 MV Orcadia (1962), an Orkney ferry built by Hall, Russell & Co, Aberdeen
 MV Orcadia (1977), a ferry owned by Pentland Ferries since 2015

Biology
Orcadia (protist), a genus of foraminifera in the order Globigerinida
Orcadia (fungus), a genus of sac fungi in the order Pezizales

Other uses
 A 2001 episode of the TV show Comedy Lab